The Marano is a river in San Marino and Emilia-Romagna in Italy. The source of the river is southeast of Domagnano in San Marino. The river flows east and it forms part of the eastern border between the province of Rimini in Italy and San Marino. The river joins with the Fiumicello close to the easternmost point of San Marino. The river flows northeast past Ospedaletto and into the Adriatic Sea northwest of Riccione and southeast of Miramare. The Marano's tributaries include the Cando.

References

International rivers of Europe
Rivers of San Marino
Rivers of Italy
Rivers of Emilia-Romagna
Rivers of the Province of Rimini
Italy–San Marino border
Adriatic Italian coast basins